The Athi-Galana-Sabaki River is the second longest river in Kenya (after the Tana River). The river rises in the Gatamaiyo Forest as the Athi River and enters the Indian Ocean as the Galana River (also known as the Sabaki River).

Flow 
The Athi River flows across the Kapote and Athi plains, through Athi River town, then takes a northeast direction where it is met by the Nairobi River. Near Thika the river forms the Fourteen Falls and turns south-south-east under the wooded slopes of the Yatta ridge, which shuts in its basin on the east. Apart from the numerous small feeders of the upper river, almost the only tributary is the Tsavo River, from the east side of Kilimanjaro, which enters at about 3° S. It then turns east, and in its lower course is known as the Sabaki (or Galana) River, which traverses the sterile quartz-land of the outer plateau. The valley is low and flat, covered with forest and scrub, containing small lakes and backwaters connected to the river during the rainy season.

Wildlife 
The river flows through the Tsavo East National Park and attracts diverse wildlife, including hippopotamus and crocodiles.
Famously, in the 2009 case of Ben Nyaumbe, the region is also home to pythons. Millions of Kenyans rely on the river for drinking water and irrigation.

Development

Thwake Dam

References 

Google Maps, Galana River

 
Rivers of Kenya